Filomena Barros Dos Reis is an East Timorese social justice activist and recipient of the N-Peace Award in 2011.

Reis was an early member of the women's human rights organization Forum Komunikasaun ba Feto Timor (FOKUPERS) which was founded in 1997. Growing out of a women's health workshop, the group has a mission to advocate for women's rights as well as women's health. She went on to join the East Timor Action Network (ETAN) where she speaks internationally to raise awareness of violence to East Timorese women.

In 2011 Reis was one of the inaugural recipients of the N-Peace Award.

See also
 Indonesian occupation of East Timor
 1999 East Timorese crisis

References

External links
N-Peace Awards 2011 Awardee - Timor Leste YouTube video

Living people
East Timorese women activists
Year of birth missing (living people)